Innocenzo Donina (16 July 1950 – 19 March 2020) was an Italian professional footballer.

Biography
He played in all three of Italy's top professional leagues for several teams.

On 19 March 2020, Donina died from COVID-19, amid its pandemic in Italy.

References

External links
 

1950 births
2020 deaths
Italian footballers
Atalanta B.C. players
U.S. Cremonese players
A.C. Reggiana 1919 players
L.R. Vicenza players
S.S.C. Bari players
Serie A players
Serie B players
Serie C players
Association football midfielders
Sportspeople from the Province of Brescia
Deaths from the COVID-19 pandemic in Lombardy
Footballers from Lombardy